Phorbas is a genus of demosponges belonging to the family Hymedesmiidae.

Species 
The following species are recognised:

References 

Demospongiae
Sponge genera